Malaysia competed in the 2011 Southeast Asian Games held in Palembang, Indonesia from 11–25 November 2011.

Medal summary

Medallists

Aquatics

Diving

Men

Women

Swimming

Men

Women

Baseball

Men's tournament
Preliminary round

First game is at 10:00, and the second game is at 14:30, UTC+7.

Basketball

Men's tournament
Group B

Semifinal

Bronze medal match

Women's tournament
All times are Western Indonesian Time (WIB) – UTC+7.

Football

Men's tournament
Group A
In the last week of October 2011, the Football Association of Indonesia had rescheduled the first round of matches for the group twice, originally moving it forward to 8 November and eventually to 7 November.  The second, third and fourth round of fixture had also been moved forward accordingly while the final round of fixtures remained on the 17th.

Semifinal

Gold medal match

Indoor volleyball

Men's tournament
Preliminary round

|}

References

Southeast Asian Games
2011
Nations at the 2011 Southeast Asian Games